Henry Stanford is a former American football coach. He was the head football coach at Hiram University in Hiram, Ohio, a position he assumed in 2016 after three previous seasons as the team's offensive coordinator. Stanford resigned during the 2019 season after the Terriers started with an 0–6 record and 0–5 mark in North Coast Athletic Conference play. Stanford served as the head coach at Capital University in Columbus, Ohio from 2010 to 2012.

Head coaching record

Notes

References

Year of birth missing (living people)
Living people
Capital Comets football coaches
Elmhurst Bluejays football coaches
Hiram Terriers football coaches
Kenyon Lords football coaches
Ohio State Buckeyes football coaches
Otterbein Cardinals football coaches
Tiffin Dragons football coaches